Margaret Stewart or Stuart may refer to:

Royalty and Nobility
Margaret Stewart, Countess of Angus (died 1417), wife of Thomas, Earl of Mar; mother of George Douglas, 1st Earl of Angus
Margaret Stewart, Dauphine of France (1424–1445), princess of Scotland; Dauphine of France as wife to future Louis XI
Margaret Stewart (born c. 1455), daughter of James II of Scotland and niece of the Dauphine
Margaret Douglas (1515–1578), married name Margaret Stewart, countess of Lennox and half-sister of James V of Scotland
Margaret Tudor (1489–1541), queen and regent of Scotland, wife of James IV of Scotland and sister of Henry VIII of England
Margaret Stuart (1598–1600), daughter of James VI.
Margaret of Denmark, Queen of Scotland (1456–1486), daughter of King Christian I of Denmark and wife of James III, King of Scots
Margaret Howard, Countess of Nottingham (c. 1591–1639), née Margaret Stewart
Margaret Stewart, Mistress of Ochiltree (died 1627), courtier in the household of Anne of Denmark
Margaret Stewart, Lady Gordon (born 1498), daughter of James IV of Scotland and Margaret Drummond

Others
Margie Stewart (1919–2012), American model
Margaret Stuart (poet) (1889–1963), British poet and writer
Margaret Stuart (athlete) (1934–1999), New Zealand sprinter and hurdler
Margaret Stewart (herpetologist) (1927–2006), American herpetologist

See also
Peggy Stewart (disambiguation)